Dead Tired is a 1994 French comedy film directed by Michel Blanc. It was entered into the 1994 Cannes Film Festival.

Plot
Michel Blanc is a great film actor. However, he has been accused of sexually abusing actresses Josiane Balasko, Charlotte Gainsbourg and Mathilda May, of behaving like a cad at Cannes and of accepting dubious publicity deals, such as appearances in supermarkets, behind the back of his agent. The evidence is there for everyone to see, but Blanc knows he is innocent. He seeks assistance from fellow actress Carole Bouquet to shed light on this matter, and he discovers that he has a perfect double, Patrick Olivier, who, having suffered all his life from his likeness to Michel Blanc, has decided to use this to his financial advantage.

Cast

 Michel Blanc as himself / Patrick Olivier
 Carole Bouquet as herself
 Philippe Noiret as himself
 Josiane Balasko as herself
 Marie-Anne Chazel as herself
 Christian Clavier as himself
 Guillaume Durand as himself
 Charlotte Gainsbourg as herself
 David Hallyday as himself
 Estelle Lefébure as herself
 Gérard Jugnot as himself
 Dominique Lavanant as herself
 Thierry Lhermitte as himself
 Mathilda May as herself
 Roman Polanski as himself
 Andrée Damant as Madame Volpi
 Dorothée Jemma as The Pregnant Woman
 Philippe du Janerand as Inspector
 François Morel as Inspector's assistant
 Jean-Louis Richard as Psychiatrist
 Bruno Moynot as The driver
 Raoul Billerey as Michel Blanc's father
 Dominique Besnehard as Michel Blanc's agent
 Bernard Farcy as The ANPE employee
 Vincent Grass as The swinger

Reception

Critical response
On Rotten Tomatoes, the film holds an approval rating of 50%, based on 6 reviews, with an average rating of 6.8/10.

Box office
In its opening week in France, the film grossed 14.3 million French Franc ($2.5 million), finishing second to fellow Cannes opener La Reine Margot at the box office. In its second week it expanded from 189 to 283 screens and became the number one film in France and was there for two weeks.

Accolades

References

External links

1994 films
1994 comedy films
French comedy films
1990s French-language films
Films directed by Michel Blanc
Films with screenplays by Jacques Audiard
Self-reflexive films
1990s French films